Jordie van der Laan (born 28 October 1993) is a Dutch football player who last played for DOVO in the Derde Divisie. He is now playing in the NPL for Bentleigh Greens.

Club career
Van der Laan played youth football for JVC Cuijk. Between 2002 and 2005, he part of the PSV youth academy. He then returned to JVC Cuijk, where he played with the first team in the Topklasse Sunday from 2012 to 2015. In 2015, he left for Juliana '31, and via FC Lienden he returned to JVC Cuijk in 2017.

In the summer of 2018, Van der Laan moved to DOVO, but a clause was included in his contract that he could leave if an offer from a professional club would come during this transfer period. This offer came from Telstar, and thus he left without playing for DOVO. He signed a one-year deal.

Van der Laan made his Eerste Divisie debut for Telstar on 17 August 2018 in a game against RKC Waalwijk, as a starter. In May 2019 Van der Laan was terminated by Telstar after falsely reporting as sick to training so that he could attend the semifinal match of the UEFA Champions League between Tottenham Hotspur and Ajax in London.

He signed with Kozakken Boys for the next season. From January 2020, Kozakken Boys put Van der Laan on loan at ASWH, a newly promoted team that was struggling at the bottom of the Tweede Divisie league. ASWH remained in the Tweede Divisie as the football season was terminated due to the COVID-19 pandemic in the Netherlands. Van der Laan moved to DOVO in the Derde Divisie ahead of the 2020–21 season. He left the club in April 2021, before the season was over, alongside Shanon Carmelia and Bo van Essen.

References

External links
 

1993 births
Living people
Dutch footballers
People from Cuijk
Association football forwards
JVC Cuijk players
PSV Eindhoven players
FC Lienden players
SC Telstar players
Kozakken Boys players
ASWH players
VV DOVO players
Eerste Divisie players
Tweede Divisie players
Derde Divisie players
Juliana '31 players
Footballers from North Brabant